Paphinia posadarum is a species of orchid found from Colombia to Ecuador.

Taxonomy 
The classification of this orchid species was published Calaway H. Dodson & Rodrigo Escobar in Orquideologia; Revista de la Sociedad Colombiana de Orquideologia -Medellin, 18(3): 230 - 1993. Colombia. This species is found in Colombia & Ecuador.

References

External links 

posadarum
Orchids of Colombia
Orchids of Ecuador